The 2020–21 Women's Big Bash League season or WBBL|06 was the sixth season of the Women's Big Bash League (WBBL), the semi-professional women's Twenty20 domestic cricket competition in Australia. The tournament took place from 25 October to 28 November 2020. It was played entirely in Sydney due to ongoing state border restrictions brought about by the COVID-19 pandemic.

The Brisbane Heat entered the season as double defending champions, having won back-to-back titles in WBBL04 and WBBL05. The Heat finished the regular season with seven-straight wins but suffered an "epic meltdown" in a twelve-run semi-final loss against the Sydney Thunder, ending their hunt for a three-peat.

In the final, held at North Sydney Oval, the Sydney Thunder defeated the Melbourne Stars by seven wickets with 38 balls remaining to win their second Women's Big Bash League title. Shabnim Ismail was awarded Player of the Match after taking key early wickets against the top-qualifying Stars team, leading to a "thumping" victory for the Thunder.

Sophie Devine was named Player of the Tournament in her first season with the Perth Scorchers, earning the same award she won in WBBL|05 while playing for the Adelaide Strikers.

Teams
Each squad was made up of 15 active players. Teams could sign up to five 'marquee players', with a maximum of three of those from overseas. Marquees were classed as any overseas player, or a local player who holds a Cricket Australia national contract at the start of the WBBL signing period.

The table below lists each team's marquee players and other key details for the season.

Personnel changes

Local players 
The table below lists local player movements made ahead of the season.

Overseas players 
The table below lists overseas player movements made ahead of the season.

Replacement players 
Designed to overcome bio-security rules that prevent fresh players being brought into the hub, the replacement player pool includes four New Zealanders and 16 locals, all living inside the WBBL Village. Each player trains with a host club but can be signed by any team, and they are released back into the pool once the original replaced player returns from their relevant injury or availability issue. It is therefore possible that a player from the replacement pool finds themselves lining up for multiple teams throughout the season.

Replacement players to appear in one game or more during the season included:

 New Zealand's Rosemary Mair played for the Melbourne Stars on 25 October and 17 November, replacing Katherine Brunt (managed). Mair also played five games for the Melbourne Renegades from 3–14 November, replacing Lea Tahuhu (side strain).
New Zealand's Katie Perkins played for the Adelaide Strikers on 26 October, replacing Suzie Bates (shoulder).
Gabby Sutcliffe played for the Sydney Thunder on 1 November, replacing Hannah Darlington (ankle/shin).
New Zealand's Lauren Down played seven matches for the Perth Scorchers from 1–11 November, replacing Amy Jones (quad injury).
Anna Lanning played three games for the Melbourne Stars from 10 to 22 November, replacing Georgia Gall (finger).
Amy Yates played six games for the Melbourne Renegades from 14 to 22 November, replacing Georgia Wareham (shin).
Rebecca Carter played one game for the Melbourne Renegades on 22 November, replacing Maitlan Brown (hamstring).

Leadership 
Coaching changes made ahead of the season included:
 Shelley Nitschke was appointed head coach of the Perth Scorchers, replacing Lisa Keightley who departed to take on the role as coach of England.
 As part of Cricket Victoria's cost-cutting organisational restructure, the Melbourne Renegades did not renew the contract of head coach Tim Coyle despite achieving two consecutive finals appearances. Lachlan Stevens, who coached the Renegades in their first two seasons, was announced as Coyle's replacement.
 David Hemp parted ways with the Melbourne Stars and was initially replaced as head coach by Leah Poulton. However, a month after her appointment, Poulton resigned from the position to undertake the role of Head of Female Cricket at Cricket NSW. The Stars then announced Trent Woodhill would take over the top coaching job.
Captaincy changes made ahead of the season included:

 Jess Jonassen was appointed captain of the Brisbane Heat, replacing Kirby Short (34–19 win–loss record) who retired from cricket at the end of WBBL|05.
 The Perth Scorchers appointed new recruit Sophie Devine as captain, replacing Meg Lanning (14–10).
 Amy Satterthwaite resumed her role as captain of the Melbourne Renegades, after Jess Duffin (7–7) stepped into the position for a season.
 Meg Lanning resumed her role as captain of the Melbourne Stars, taking over from Elyse Villani (2–12).
Captaincy changes made during the season included:

 Megan Schutt stood in as acting captain of the Adelaide Strikers for 13 games, replacing Suzie Bates who was sidelined with a shoulder injury.
 Beth Mooney stood in as acting captain of the Perth Scorchers for two games, replacing Sophie Devine who was sidelined with a back injury.

Points table

Win–loss table 
Below is a summary of results for each team's fourteen regular season matches, plus finals where applicable, in chronological order. A team's opponent for any given match is listed above the margin of victory/defeat.

Last updated: 28 November 2020

Fixtures
Cricket Australia (CA) released the original fixture for WBBL|06 on 15 July 2020 with the stipulation that it was subject to any change that may be required as a result of the COVID-19 pandemic. On 4 September, CA announced changes to the schedule which would see the tournament begin a week later, on October 25, and be played entirely in Sydney as a result of ongoing uncertainty surrounding state border restrictions.

On 25 September, CA released the revised schedule, confirming the five venues to be used for all regular season matches: North Sydney Oval, Hurstville Oval, Drummoyne Oval, Sydney Showground Stadium and Blacktown International Sportspark. CA also revealed it would create a "WBBL Village" in Sydney Olympic Park to accommodate players and staff from all eight teams for the duration of the tournament. As per all previous seasons, WBBL|06 consisted of a 56-match double round-robin, followed by a finals series featuring the top four qualifiers.

On 16 October, admission tickets were released to the public for all weekend games at North Sydney Oval and Sydney Showground Stadium, as well as Wednesday games at Blacktown International Sportspark. All matches held at Drummoyne Oval and Hurstville Oval would remain closed to the general public. CA also announced several minor scheduling changes to five fixtures: the opening day clash between the Renegades and the Stars swapped times and venues with the encounter between the Scorchers and the Heat; the times and venues of the 15 November Renegades–Stars and Hurricanes–Heat matches were altered; the start time of the Thunder–Scorchers match on 15 November was brought forward.

On 28 October, four additional changes to the fixture were announced. The Sixers–Heat and Thunder–Renegades games on 17 November, as well as the Strikers–Renegades and Thunder–Sixers games on 18 November, were moved to Sydney Showground Stadium, allowing the touring Indian men's team to utilise a bio-secure training environment at Blacktown International Sportspark. The rescheduled matches on 18 November would remain open to the public.

On 11 November, Cricket Australia announced the finals series would be played in prime time TV slots for the first occasion in the league's history. The semi-finals (on 25 and 26 November) and the final (on 28 November) were all scheduled at North Sydney Oval under lights. Additionally, a reserve day on 29 November was allocated in the event of weather preventing a result in the final's original fixture.

All times are local time

Week 1

Week 2

Week 3

Week 4

Week 5

In front of a sold out reduced-capacity home crowd, the Sydney Sixers put on a 104-run opening partnership which came to an end during the 13th over when Alyssa Healy was stumped by Josie Dooley off the bowling of Molly Strano for 63. Two balls later, Ellyse Perry was dismissed for 37 by a spectacular diving catch from Courtney Webb, lauded as a contender for the best of the season. Marizanne Kapp (22 not out from 17 balls) and Erin Burns (19 off 11) helped the Sixers finish their innings with a total of 4/166.

On the first ball of the run chase, Lizelle Lee was dropped at backward point off the bowling of Perry. At just 3/70 in the 11th over, Webb joined Lee in the middle for the Melbourne Renegades to form a rapid 73-run stand from 33 deliveries. Sixers veteran Sarah Aley eventually broke through in the 16th over, removing Lee for 79 via a Burns catch in the outfield. Requiring 24 runs from the remaining 26 balls, Webb (46 not out off 28) saw the Renegades across the line with six wickets in hand inside the last over, mirroring her finishing heroics of a similarly tight encounter between the two teams in WBBL05. The loss dramatically decreased the Sixers' chances of qualifying for finals heading into the final day of the regular season.

The match was also shrouded in controversy, and the outcome potentially affected, due to an "administration error" self-reported by the Sixers before the commencement of the second innings. Hayley Silver-Holmes, who had missed several previous games due to injury, was named in the team line-up despite not having yet been granted approval by the W/BBL Technical Committee to be added back into the official squad. Upon discovering the mistake, the Sixers ensured Silver-Holmes took no active part in the game and Maddy Darke replaced her as a substitute fielder, leaving them a bowler short in what was essentially a must-win game. Cricket Australia (CA) fined the Sixers $25,000 ($15,000 suspended for twelve months) with CA's Head of Integrity and Security stating that the breach, "while serious in nature," had a "reduced impact due to the Club's actions" during the game.

Knockout phase

Semi-finals

Tammy Beaumont launched the Sydney Thunder off to a fast start with 27 runs from 20 deliveries, though she was brought undone by a Nicola Hancock slower ball during the last over of the powerplay. The Thunder struggled throughout the middle portion of the innings, especially troubled by Brisbane Heat bowlers Nadine de Klerk and Amelia Kerr who collectively managed economical figures of 3/30 from seven overs. Instead of choosing to bowl the 20th over herself, Heat captain Jess Jonassen turned to the medium pace of Delissa Kimmince to close out the innings. Thunder captain Rachael Haynes ensured a respectable total for her team, finishing on 48 not out, as Sydney scored 15 from the final over and set Brisbane a target of 144 for victory.

Thunder spinner Samantha Bates struck early in the run chase, bowling Grace Harris for six, before being hit for three consecutive boundaries in the fourth over by Georgia Redmayne. Soon after playing-and-missing three times in a row to Shabnim Ismail, Redmayne was caught for 25 by Haynes at mid-on off the bowling of Sammy-Jo Johnson. Promoted up the batting order to number three, de Klerk formed a steady partnership with Jonassen, putting on 46 runs together in little more than six overs. When Jonassen fell for 19 (caught-and-bowled by Hannah Darlington) the Heat required a manageable task of 64 runs from 52 balls with seven wickets in hand. In the following over, de Klerk was run out by a direct hit from Beaumont for a run-a-ball 27. Facing her first delivery, Laura Kimmince survived an extremely close call, playing a flighted Bates delivery on to leg stump—the ball, however, did not connect with enough force to dislodge the bails. Kimmince quickly took advantage of her luck, manically compiling 37 runs from her next 15 balls. Although her aggressive strokeplay led to a plummeting required run rate, she was involved in two running-between-the-wickets mix-ups which led to the run outs of Georgia Voll and Amelia Kerr, keeping the door ajar for a miraculous Sydney comeback.

On the last delivery of the 17th over, with the Brisbane Heat needing just 16 runs to win, Laura Kimmince attempted a high-risk reverse slog against Samantha Bates, only to miss the ball which deflected off her thigh before crashing into the stumps—the bails, this time, were sent airborne. Taking the ball in the 18th over, Hannah Darlington struck twice in two balls to put the Heat in the precarious position of needing 14 runs with only one wicket in hand. Sammy-Jo Johnson completed the Thunder's remarkable resurrection on the third ball of the 19th over, removing Delissa Kimmince for a golden duck via caught-and-bowled, sealing a twelve-run victory and cementing Sydney's spot in Saturday's final. Brisbane's sudden "horror" collapse consisted of losing six wickets for twelve runs, ultimately ending their seven-match winning streak and quest for a three-peat. Media outlets described the match and its unlikely outcome as "chaotic," a "rollercoaster" and "one of the best comebacks in the WBBL's short history." Seven Network commentator Trent Copeland said "when Kimmince was flying you thought the game was gone," and Fox Cricket analyst Molly Strano commented "I don't think I've seen such massive swings in momentum in a game, ever."

Final

From the first over of the match, the Melbourne Stars top-order was dominated by a "fiery" spell from Sydney Thunder pace bowler Shabnim Ismail, who regularly beat the bat of Elyse Villani and created two catching opportunities against Meg Lanning before dismissing both players for scores of one and 13 respectively. After being dropped on zero by Tammy Beaumont at point, as well as surviving a half-chance which Sammy-Jo Johnson put down at third man, Lanning's seven-ball battle with Ismail came to an end when she edged a seaming delivery through to wicket-keeper Tahlia Wilson at the start of the seventh over. Thunder captain Rachael Haynes was praised for "sensing the moment" by taking the tactical risk of persisting with Ismail, leading to Lanning's wicket which several media outlets described as the defining moment of the match: writing for The Sydney Morning Herald, Tom Decent said "this was the Thunder's night about a quarter of an hour into the contest," while the Australian Associated Press suggested the "Stars' shot at a maiden title was realistically gone inside 37 balls."

Melbourne could not recover from their poor start to post a significant total, slumping further to 5/37 by the halfway mark of the first innings. Annabel Sutherland scored 20 from as many balls but, like Lanning, did not capitalise on two reprieves afforded to her by the Thunder's underwhelming performance in the field. Wickets continued to flow as every Sydney bowler picked up at least one each. Johnson, having opened the bowling with Ismail and proving similarly difficult to score against, finished with match-best figures of 2/11 off four overs which included claiming the wicket of Mignon du Preez via LBW during the powerplay. Katherine Brunt, ending the innings on 22 not out from 27 deliveries, ensured the Stars lasted the allotted 20 overs but their overall score of 9/86 was nevertheless the lowest-ever in a WBBL final.

In reply, Tammy Beaumont (16 off 15) and Rachel Trenaman (23 off 26) steadily opened the Thunder's innings, while experienced campaigners Heather Knight (26 not out) and Rachael Haynes (21 not out) completed the comfortable run chase through a flurry of boundaries. With a lofted drive over long-off that sailed for six, Knight hit the winning runs off the bowling of Alana King in the 14th over, clinching a seven-wicket victory with 38 balls remaining. The Sydney Thunder consequently claimed their second WBBL championship, having also won the inaugural title—only Haynes and Samantha Bates were members of both successful squads, the latter missing the WBBL|01 final due to a broken wrist injury sustained earlier in the tournament. The triumph also marked an individual three-peat for Sammy-Jo Johnson, who won the WBBL04 and WBBL05 titles with the Brisbane Heat before moving to the Thunder. Lauren Smith—making her fifth appearance in a WBBL final—earned a third Women's Big Bash League championship as well, having won the WBBL02 and WBBL03 titles with the Sydney Sixers.

A major talking point of the match surrounded the decision made by the Melbourne Stars at the bat flip. Stars captain Meg Lanning sent her own team in to bat first, a noticeable departure from the tactics she employed throughout the season. In fact, it was the first time a Lanning-led WBBL team would opt against chasing since the 2016–17 season. Explaining the shock choice, Lanning said: "We just thought our batting line-up was in really good form, and we thought we'd back ourselves in to get a decent score." Stars coach Trent Woodhill implied the decision was swayed by the Brisbane Heat's collapse under pressure two days earlier: "We also saw what happened with the Heat and the Thunder (semi-final) the other night." The following day, Woodhill added: "It was a sliding door moment. There's no regrets. It was a team decision."

Statistics

Highest totals

Most runs

Most wickets

Awards

Player of the tournament 
Player of the Tournament votes are awarded on a 3-2-1 basis by the two standing umpires at the conclusion of every match, meaning a player can receive a maximum of six votes per game.

Source:

Team of the tournament 
The selection panel for the Team of the Tournament was made up of former players Lisa Sthalekar (Seven Network) and Mel Jones (Fox Cricket), cricket.com.au journalist Laura Jolly and national selector Shawn Flegler. The team is intended to mimic regular WBBL conditions such as a maximum of three overseas players, a realistic mix of batters and bowlers, as well as a captain, wicket-keeper, twelfth man and coach.

  Beth Mooney (Perth Scorchers) – wicket-keeper
  Sophie Devine (Perth Scorchers)
  Meg Lanning (Melbourne Stars) – captain
  Heather Knight (Sydney Thunder)
  Nat Sciver (Melbourne Stars)
  Laura Kimmince (Brisbane Heat)
  Alana King (Melbourne Stars)
  Sarah Coyte (Adelaide Strikers)
  Hannah Darlington (Sydney Thunder)
  Taneale Peschel (Perth Scorchers)
  Samantha Bates (Sydney Thunder)
  Darcie Brown (Adelaide Strikers)  – twelfth man
  Ashley Noffke (Brisbane Heat) – coach

Source:

Young gun award
Players under 21 years of age at the start of the season are eligible for the Young Gun Award. Weekly winners are selected over the course of the season by the Women's National Selection Panel based on match performance, on-field and off-field attitude, as well as their demonstration of skill, tenacity and good sportsmanship. The overall winner receives a $5000 cash prize and access to the Rebel Mentor Program, as well as becoming a member of the Rebel Women Program.

The nominees for the WBBL|06 Young Gun were:
Week 1: Darcie Brown (Adelaide Strikers) – winner
Week 2: Rachel Trenaman (Sydney Thunder)
Week 3: Amy Smith (Hobart Hurricanes)
Week 4: Courtney Webb (Melbourne Renegades)
Week 5: Phoebe Litchfield (Sydney Thunder)
Adelaide Strikers fast bowler Darcie Brown took out the overall award, having claimed ten wickets in her debut season at an economy rate of 5.52 runs per over.

Most valuable players
Each team designated an award to adjudge and recognise their most outstanding contributor for the season.

 Adelaide Strikers: Sarah Coyte
 Brisbane Heat: Amelia Kerr
 Hobart Hurricanes: Rachel Priest
 Melbourne Renegades: Courtney Webb
 Melbourne Stars: Nat Sciver
 Perth Scorchers: Beth Mooney
 Sydney Sixers: Alyssa Healy
 Sydney Thunder: Heather Knight

"Player of the match" tally
The table below shows the number of Player of the Match awards won by each player throughout the season. The career tally indicates the number of awards won by a player throughout her entire time in the league at the conclusion of the season, including awards won while previously playing for a different WBBL team.

Media coverage
Television coverage of the competition increased from previous seasons with the Seven Network broadcasting (and Fox Cricket simulcasting) 24 games, up from the 23 that were aired in WBBL05. The remaining 35 games were streamed on Cricket Australia's website and app. All 59 matches were also available to watch live and on-demand via Kayo. On 15 October, CA announced Fox Cricket would broadcast an additional twelve matches—the mid-week fixtures at Blacktown International Sportspark—bringing the total number of televised WBBL|06 games to 36.

See also
 2020–21 Big Bash League season

Notes

References

External links
 Official fixtures
 Series home at ESPN Cricinfo

 
2020–21 Women's Big Bash League season by team
Women's Big Bash League seasons
!
Women's Big Bash League